The Fatherland Front was a Bulgarian pro-communist political resistance movement, which began in 1942 during World War II. The Zveno movement, the communist Bulgarian Workers Party, a wing of the Bulgarian Agrarian National Union and the Bulgarian Social Democratic Workers Party all became part of the OF. The constituent groups of the OF had widely contrasting ideologies and had united only in the face of the pro-German militarist dictatorship in Bulgaria. At the beginning, the members of the OF worked together, without a single dominating group. Professional associations and unions could be members of the front and maintain their organisational independence. However, the Bulgarian Communist Party soon began to dominate. In 1944, after the Soviet Union had declared war on Bulgaria, the OF carried out a coup d'état (9 September 1944) and declared war on Germany and the other Axis powers. The OF government, headed by Kimon Georgiev of Zveno, signed a ceasefire treaty with the Soviet Union (28 October 1944). In the summer of 1945 most of BANU led by Nikola Petkov and most of the Social-Democrats had left the OF and became a large opposition group which later on after the 1946 Grand National Assembly election would become a coalition named "Federation of the village and urban labour" with 99 MPs out of 465.

On November 18, 1945, the OF won a large majority in national elections. In November 1946 Georgiev resigned as Prime Minister and was succeeded by Georgi Dimitrov, leader of the communists. Bulgaria became a People's Republic on 15 September 1946 after a referendum. In 1948 and 1949 all the remaining parties in the OF save for the pro-communist wing of the BANU self-dissolved and merged into the BCP. The OF eventually transformed into a wide-ranging popular front under overall Communist control. With the fall of communism in Bulgaria the Fatherland Front was dissolved in 1990.

Chairmen of the National Council 
 Georgi Dimitrov (1942–1949)
 Valko Chervenkov (1949–1956)
 Encho Stajkov (1956–1967)
 Boyan Bulgaranov (1967–1972)
 Georgi Traikov (1972–1974)
 Pencho Kubadinski (1974–1989)
 Zhivko Zhivkov (1989–1990)

Electoral history

Grand National Assembly elections

References

1942 establishments in Bulgaria
1989 disestablishments in Bulgaria
Anti-fascist organizations
Bulgaria–Soviet Union relations
Bulgarian Communist Party
Defunct left-wing political party alliances
Defunct political party alliances in Bulgaria
Eastern European World War II resistance movements
People's Republic of Bulgaria
Political parties disestablished in 1989
Political parties established in 1942
Popular fronts of communist states
Stalinist parties